Starvation Creek State Park is a state park located west of Hood River, Oregon in the Columbia River Gorge.  It was named Starvation Creek because a train was stopped there by snow drifts and passengers had to dig out the train.  No one starved there.

Starvation Creek has a small waterfall and a trailhead for hiking.

Images

References

 
State parks of Oregon
Columbia River Gorge
Historic Columbia River Highway